The 2019–20 season was Ergotelis' 90th season in existence and 13th overall in the second tier of the Greek football league system, as of this season restructured and founded as the Super League 2. The club also participated in the Greek Cup, entering the competition in the Fourth Round. The contents of this article cover club activities from 18 May 2019 until 30 June 2020.

Following a string of suspension periods due to lengthy and unfruitful negotiations of the Super League 2 board members with state broadcaster ERT, the season eventually began on 29 September 2019, with the club playing its last game on 9 March 2020. On 22 June 2020, following another lengthy suspension period due to the COVID-19 pandemic, the Super League 2 clubs voted by an overwhelming majority to formally end the 2019/20 season, declaring the current league standings as final. As a result, Ergotelis finished in the seventh spot of the Table with 29 points.

Players

The following players have departed in mid-season 

Note: Flags indicate national team as has been defined under FIFA eligibility rules. Players and Managers may hold more than one non-FIFA nationality.

Transfers

In

Promoted from youth system 

Total spending: €0

Out 
 
Total income: €0
Expenditure: €0

Managerial changes

Kit 
2019−20

|
|
|Variations

|Friendlies

|
|
|

Preseason and friendlies

Preseason friendlies 

1. 60-minute friendly.
2. 135-minute friendly.
3. Indefinitely postponed due to unavailability of Stadium.

Mid-season friendlies

Competitions

Overview 

Last updated: 22 June 2020

Super League 2

Regular season

League table

Results summary

Results by round

Matches 

a. Match not held due to the COVID-19 pandemic.

Greek Cup

Fourth round

Matches

Fifth Round

Matches

Statistics

Squad statistics 

! colspan="9" style="background:#DCDCDC; text-align:center" | Goalkeepers
|-

! colspan="9" style="background:#DCDCDC; text-align:center" | Defenders
|-

! colspan="9" style="background:#DCDCDC; text-align:center" | Midfielders
|-

! colspan="9" style="background:#DCDCDC; text-align:center" | Forwards
|-

! colspan="9" style="background:#DCDCDC; text-align:center" | Players transferred/loaned out during the season
|-

|}

Goal scorers 

Last updated: 9 March 2020
Source: Competitive matches

Disciplinary record 

Last updated: 9 March 2020
Source: Competitive matches
 = Number of bookings;  = Number of sending offs after a second yellow card;  = Number of sending offs by a direct red card.

Injury record

References 

Ergotelis
Ergotelis F.C. seasons